Julio César Herrera Cabrera (born March 11, 1977 in Havana) is a retired male track cyclist from Cuba. He competed for his native country in the 2000 and 2004 Summer Olympics. Herrera won three medals at the 1999 Pan American Games in Winnipeg, Manitoba, Canada.

Career
Herrera won the sprint silver medal and the 1 km time trial bronze in the 2002 Pan American Championships held in Quito, Ecuador.

References

External links

1977 births
Living people
Cuban track cyclists
Cyclists at the 1999 Pan American Games
Cyclists at the 2000 Summer Olympics
Cyclists at the 2004 Summer Olympics
Cyclists at the 2007 Pan American Games
Olympic cyclists of Cuba
Sportspeople from Havana
Cuban male cyclists
Pan American Games gold medalists for Cuba
Pan American Games silver medalists for Cuba
Pan American Games bronze medalists for Cuba
Pan American Games medalists in cycling
Central American and Caribbean Games gold medalists for Cuba
Central American and Caribbean Games silver medalists for Cuba
Central American and Caribbean Games bronze medalists for Cuba
Competitors at the 2006 Central American and Caribbean Games
Central American and Caribbean Games medalists in cycling
Medalists at the 2007 Pan American Games
20th-century Cuban people
21st-century Cuban people